Karl August Auberlen (19 November 1824 – 2 May 1864) was a German Lutheran theologian.

Life
He was born at Fellbach, near Stuttgart, 19 November 1824. He studied in the seminary of Blaubeuren 1837-41, and theology at Tübingen 1841-45. He became repentant in theology at Tübingen 1849, and professor at Basel 1851. As a young man he was attracted by the views of Goethe and Hegel and enthusiastic for the criticism of Ferdinand Christian Baur; but he later became an adherent of the old Württemberg circle of theologians, of Johann Albrecht Bengel, Friedrich Christoph Oetinger, Lothar Roos, and others. He died at Basel on 2 May  1864.

Works
He published:

 Die Theosophie Oetingers (Tübingen, 1847); 
 Der Prophet Daniel und die Offenbarung Johannis (Basel, 1854; Eng. transl., by Adolph Saphir, The Prophecies of Daniel and the Revelation, Edinburgh, 1874; 2d German ed., 1857); 
 Die götttiche Offenbarung (i, Basel, 1861; Eng. transl., with memoir, Edinburgh, 1867).

A volume of sermons appeared in 1845; a volume of lectures on the Christian faith in 1861.

Further reading 
 Werner Raupp: "Auberlen, Carl August", in: Religion in Geschichte und Gegenwart (RGG), 4. Ed., Vol. 1, 1998, col. 910.

Notes

Attribution

1824 births
1864 deaths
People from Fellbach
People from the Kingdom of Württemberg
German Lutheran theologians
German male non-fiction writers
19th-century Lutherans